José Lewgoy (16 November 1920 – 10 February 2003) was a Brazilian actor. He is recognizable to many art-house cinema fans for his role as Don Aquilino in Werner Herzog's 1982 film Fitzcarraldo.

Biography
He was born in Veranópolis, Rio Grande do Sul, Brazil, to a Russian father and an American mother, who met in New York. He died in Rio de Janeiro. He was considered one of the best actors in Brazil, and was usually typecast as a villain.

Selected filmography 

 Carnaval no Fogo (1949) - Anjo
 Quando a Noite Acaba (1950)
 Katucha (1950)
 Cascalho (1950)
 Aviso aos navegantes (1950) - Professor Scaramouche
 Maior Que o Ódio (1951)
 Aí Vem o Barão (1951) - Von Mack
 Três Vagabundos (1952) - Schultz
 Carnaval Atlântida (1952) - Conde Verdura
 Barnabé Tu És Meu (1952) - Garcia
 Areias Ardentes (1952) - Ambrósio
 Amei um Bicheiro (1953) - Almeida
 Três Recrutas (1953)
 Carnaval em Caxias (1954) - Honório Boa Morte
 Matar ou Correr (1954) - Jesse Gordon
 Escapade (1957) - Caraco
 S.O.S. Noronha (1957) - Pratinho
 A Bomb for a Dictator (1957) - Ramirez
 Quand sonnera midi (1958) - Salvador
 História de um Crápula (1965)
 Mercenários do Crime (1966) - President (Rio segment) (uncredited)
 Ring Around the World (1966) - Hotel Manager (uncredited)
 As Cariocas (1966)
 Una rosa per tutti (1967) - Floreal
 Entranced Earth (1967) - Felipe Vieira
 Arrastão (1967)
 Jerry - a grande parada (1967) - Dr. Karloff
 Tarzan and the Jungle Boy (1968) - Djenda (uncredited)
 Palmeiras Negras (1968) - Pepito
 Roberto Carlos e o Diamante Cor-de-rosa (1968)
 Roberto Carlos em Ritmo de Aventura (1968) - Pierre
 Os Viciados (1968) - (segment "Trajetória, A")
 A Vida Provisória (1968)
 Operaçao Tumulto (1969) - Le père
 Os Paqueras (1969) - Marido
 A um Pulo da Morte (1969)
 A Cama Ao Alcance de Todos (1969) - Gangster
 O Donzelo (1970)
 Mortal Sin (1970) - José
 O Bolão (1970)
 Não Aperta, Aparício (1970)
 Pra Quem Fica, Tchau (1971) - Tio Gustavo
 Os Amores de Um Cafona (1971) - Almir
 Lua-de-Mel e Amendoim (1971) - Lover of Serginho's mother
 Gaudêncio, o Centauro dos Pampas (1971) - Giovanni
 A Viúva Virgem (1972) - Padre
 Independência ou Morte (1972)
 Os Mansos (1972) - (segment "A B... de Ouro")
 O Grande Gozador (1972)
 Como É Boa Nossa Empregada (1973) - Dr. Leonel (segment "O terror das empregadas")
 Relatório de Um Homem Casado (1974)
 Gente que Transa (1974) - Casimiro Bilac
 As Alegres Vigaristas (1974)
 Um Soutien Para Papai (1975)
 Intimidade (1975) - Industrialist
 Eu Dou O Que Ela Gosta (1975)
 As Secretárias... Que Fazem de Tudo (1975)
 O Flagrante (1976)
 Padre Cícero (1976)
 O Quarto da Viúva (1976)
 O Ibraim do Subúrbio (1976) - Casimiro de Abreu de Sousa
 O Homem de Papel (1976) - Raul
 Ouro Sangrento (1977)
 Os Mucker (1978) - Abílio
 O Outro Lado do Crime (1978) - Alberto Lima Cordeiro
 O Gigante da América (1978)
 Diário da Província (1978)
 Curumim (1978)
 Terror e Êxtase (1979) - Pai de Betinho
 República dos Assassinos (1979) - Gilberto
 Engraçadinha (1981) - Arnaldo
 Fitzcarraldo (1982) - Don Aquilino
 Tensão no Rio (1982)
 Tabu (1982) - João do Rio
 Perdida em Sodoma (1982) - Dr. Sander
 Blame It on Rio (1984) - Eduardo Marques
 Quando o Carnaval Chegar (1984) - Anjo
 Kiss of the Spider Woman (1985) - Warden
 Os Bons Tempos Voltaram, Vamos Gozar Outra Vez (1985) - Coronel (segment "Sábado Quente")
 Os Trapalhões e o Rei do Futebol (1986) - Dr.Velhaccio
 La Mansión de Araucaima (1986) - Don Graciliano 'Don Graci', The Landowner
 Cobra Verde (1987) - Don Octavio Coutinho
 The Lady from the Shanghai Cinema (1987) - Linus
 Moon over Parador (1988) - Archbishop
 Faca de Dois Gumes (1989) - Sr. Álvaro J. Amado
 Festa (1989)
 Sermões, a História de Antônio Vieira (1989)
 Stelinha (1990)
 O Escorpião Escarlate (1990)
 O Sorriso do Lagarto (1991, TV Mini Series) - Dr. Lúcio Nemésio
 Perfume de Gardênia (1992) - Ody Marques
 Boca (1994) - Quintella
 Mil e Uma (1994)
 O Quatrilho (1995) - Rocco
 O Monge e a Filha do Carrasco (1996) - Superior
 The Jew (1996) - D. Nuno da Cunha
 Anjo Mau (1997, TV Series) - Eduardo Medeiros
 Policarpo Quaresma, Herói do Brasil (1997) - Albernaz
 A Hora Mágica (1999) - Hilário / Max / Diretor
 Sonhos Tropicais (2001) - Tibério
 Apolônio Brasil, Campeão da Alegria (2003) - Dr. Boris Lewinsky - the brain scientist
 Chatô: O Rei do Brasil (2015) - General #1 (final film role)

External links
 

1920 births
2003 deaths
People from Rio Grande do Sul
Brazilian people of American descent
Brazilian people of Russian-Jewish descent
Brazilian male television actors
Brazilian male film actors
Brazilian male stage actors
Jewish Brazilian male actors
20th-century Brazilian male actors
21st-century Brazilian male actors